Be'er Milka is a moshav in southern Israel. Located in the central Negev desert close to the Egyptian border, around three kilometres from Kmehin, it falls under the jurisdiction of Ramat HaNegev Regional Council. The moshav is located in a nature reserve at the location of an ancient well at the confluence of Nahal Lavan and Nahal Nitzana.

History
In 2001 a gar'in group from Bnei HaMoshavim (associated with HaNoar HaOved VeHaLomed and the Moshavim Movement) began to organize in preparation for founding a new moshav. The gar'in group was established in 2002, and began organising themselves in Kmehin, before establishing Be'er Milka in 2006. The moshav is named after biblical Milka, the sister-in-law of Abraham (Genesis 22:20-23) and grandmother of Rebekah, the wife of Isaac (Genesis 24:47).

References

Moshavim
Populated places established in 2006
Populated places in Southern District (Israel)
2006 establishments in Israel